Krishnagiri district is one of the 38 districts (a district in the north western part) of the state of Tamil Nadu, in India. This district is carved out from Dharmapuri District by 2004.  The municipal town of Krishnagiri is the district headquarters. In Tamil Nadu, e-Governance was first introduced at Krishnagiri district under the National e-Governance Project (NEGP) in revenue and social welfare departments on a pilot basis.  The district is one of the largest producers of mangoes in India. As of 2011, the district had a population of 1,879,809 with a sex-ratio of 958 females for every 1,000 males. Hosur is the most populous town in the district.

Etymology
Krishna refers to 'black'  and giri refers to 'hill'. The area contains many granite hillocks, hence the name Krishnagiri. History says this area was under the Vijayanagara Empire, and those days it was custom to name a town or a landmark after one of its famous king, Krishnadevaraya. There is a hill with a fort on top next to the Town Bus Stand as a landmark. When Tipu Sultan conquered this area he renamed it as Syed Basha Hill and built a mosque on top. But the name of the town remained the same.

History

Krishnagiri district was formed as the 30th district of Tamil Nadu on 9 February 2004. It was formed by carving out five taluks and ten blocks of the erstwhile Dharmapuri district. The first collector of Krishnagiri was Mangat Ram Sharma.

Dolmens

Moral Pari near Mallachandram has more than 100 dolmens.

Politics 

|}

District administration
A district collector heads the district administration. Krishnagiri district is divided into two divisions and seven taluks for the purpose of revenue administration. A Revenue Divisional Officer heads each division and a Tahsildars are in charge of taluk level administration. Development administration in this district is coordinated by panchayats (or blocks) in rural areas. There are about ten panchayat unions, seven town panchayats, 352 village Panchayats and 874 revenue villages in this district. The two revenue divisions are Krishnagiri and Hosur. The eight taluks are Krishnagiri, Hosur, Pochampalli, Uthangarai, Shoolagiri, Bargur and Anchetti Denkanikottai. There are 12 panchayat unions: Kelamangalam, Thalli, Krishnagiri, Shoolagiri, Veppanapalli, Hosur, Kaveripattinam, Pochampalli, Mathur, and Uthangarai.

Geography and climate
Krishnagiri district covers an area of 5143 km². Krishnagiri district is bound by Tirupattur to the southeast, Thiruvannamalai districts to the east, Dharmapuri district to the south and Kolar, Bangalore Rural, Bangalore Urban, Ramanagara and Chamarajanagar districts of the state of Karnataka to the northwest and west and Chittoor district of the state Andhra Pradesh to the north. This district is elevated from 300 m to 1400 m above the mean sea level. It is located between 11° 12' N and 12° 49' N latitude, 77° 27' E to 78° 38' E longitude.

It basically has a mountainous terrain. The flatlands are irrigated by the South Pennar River. The eastern part of the district experiences a hot climate and the western part contrastingly has a pleasant climate. The average rainfall is 830 mm per year. March - June is the summer season. July - November is the rainy season and during December - February winter prevails.

Net cultivated, irrigated, double, multiple cropped, cultivable wasteland, water land and forest

Transportation

The following major national highway roads pass through Krishnagiri district:--

 NH - 44: (old number: NH 7; Srinagar to Kanyakumari; passes through Hosur, Krishnagiri and Kaveripattinam)
 NH - 48: (old number: NH 46; New Delhi to Chennai; passes through Hosur, Krishnagiri and Bargur)
 NH - 42: (old number: NH 219; Krishnagiri to Palamaner; starts from Krishnagiri, passes through Varatanapalli)
 NH - 77 (connecting Krishnagiri to Tindivanam, via Mathur, Uthangarai)
 NH - 648 (old number: NH 207; Hosur to Dobbaspet, via Bagalur) 
NH - 844 (old number: SH 17, Hosur to Adhiyamaankottai)

There are state highways passing through the district.

 SH 17: Malur-Hosur-Adhiyamaan Kottai 
 SH 17A: Hosur-Denkanikottai 
 SH 17B: Hosur-Denkanikottai (via Thally)
SH 17C: Bagalur-Berigai
 SH 131: Bargur-Tirupattur 
 SH 85: Attibele - Rayakottai (via Hosur and kelamangalam)
 SH 60: Hogenakkal - Tirupattur (via Mathur)
 SH 514: Kuppam - Patchur - Natrampalli 
 SH 433: Vepanapalli - Kuppam (via Gudupalle)

Also, several MDRs (Major District Roads) pass through this district. They are as follows:

1. MD-53 Bagalur - Berigai Road

2. MD-91 Denkanikottai - Kelamangalam Road

3. MD-124 Hosur Town to Hosur Railway Station Road

4. MD-157 Kaveripattinam - Kakkangarai Road

5. MD-192 Krishnagiri - Rayakottai Road

6. MD-193 KRP Dam approach Road

7. MD-366 Pondy - Krishnagiri Road

8. MD-422 Shoolagiri - Berigai Road

9. MD-424 Singarapet - Thirupathur Road

10. MD-456 Theertham - Berigai Road

11. MD-517 Uthangarai bypass road

12. MD-588 Denkanikottai - Anchetty - Natrampalayam Road

13. MD-660 Pondy Krishnagiri Road to Hill Round Road

14. MD-703 Thally - Jawalagiri - Karnataka State Border Road

15. MD-754 Kundarapalli - Veppanapalli Road

16. MD-861 Kaveripattinam - Palacode Road

17. MD-862 Kaveripattinam - Pochampalli Road

18. MD-863 Jandamedu - Puliyur Road

19. MD-1000 Veppanapalli - Theertham Road

20. MD-1001 Kurubarapalli - Kothakrishnapalli Road

21. MD 1186 - Perandapalli - Athimugam

Railways
Salem-Dharmapuri-Bengaluru broad gauge line runs through Hosur. Kovai-Erode-Jolarpettai broad gauge line runs through kallavi and Samalpatti.

Public amenities

Irrigation

The Public Works Department and Panchayat union tanks, ponds and supply channels play an important role in the irrigation of Krishnagiri district. However, they have to be desilted and strengthened. New check dams and flood protection walls have to be constructed for water conservation.

Electricity
Street lighting in rural areas is vested with the Panchayat Administration. The panchayats look after the erection of new streetlights in the hamlets, payment of current consumption charges from the panchayat funds. The procurement of tube lights, sodium vapor lights and other electrical appliances is done by the connected panchayat itself. Overall, 95% of the hamlets are covered under rural electrification. Generally the power supply position in Krishnagiri District is normal. However, in some areas the low voltage problem is felt, especially in the hamlets in the ghat section. To minimize the current consumption charges in the panchayats, efforts were taken to utilize solar power lights as an alternate and renewable source in Krishnagiri district.

Education
There is a Community Polytechnic run by the Government in Krishnagiri district. Also, the TAHDCO (Tamil Nadu Adi Dravidar Housing Development Corporation) offers nursing and catering training under vocational training courses through private training institutions to people belonging to SC/ST communities. To uplift the education of women, St. James Tailoring Institute is striving for the welfare of women in Krishnagiri town. This dress making technology gives self earning at home and makes women to get jobs in ready made garment companies in Krishnagiri itself.

Demographics
According to the 2011 census, Krishnagiri district had a population of 1,879,809 with a sex-ratio of 963 females for every 1,000 males, much above the national average of 929. A total of 217,323 were under the age of six, constituting 112,832 males and 104,491 females. Scheduled Castes and Scheduled Tribes accounted for 14.22% and 1.19% of the population respectively. The average literacy of the district was 63.2%, compared to the national average of 72.99%. The district had a total of 448,053 households. There were a total of 877,779 workers, comprising 218,600 cultivators, 197,369 main agricultural labourers, 15,237 in house hold industries, 310,795 other workers, 135,778 marginal workers, 17,438 marginal cultivators, 6 45,700 other marginal workers. 22.79% of the population lived in urban areas.

Hinduism is the major religion and is practiced by 91.7% of the population, followed by Muslim and Christian minorities which are 6.13% and 1.91%.

At the time of the 2011 census, 58.23% of the population spoke Tamil, 21.56% Telugu, 12.70% Kannada and 5.87% Urdu as their first language.

Economy

Agriculture
The important crops of Krishnagiri District are paddy, maize, ragi, banana, sugarcane, cotton, tamarind, coconut, mango, groundnut, vegetables and flowers. The district has an excellent scope for agri-business.
The Regional Agricultural Research Center of Tamil Nadu Agricultural University has been functioning efficiently at Paiyur in Kaveripattinam union since 1973. This center functions in 18.5 hec. of land. It helps the peasants to develop and adopt the modern technique of cultivation. It has developed hybrid seeds by research which yields more tonnage and good quality.
Krishnagiri district is famous for mangoes, and for the granite industry with quarries and processing units spread around the district. With a 40% share, the district is the top producer of ragi in Tamil Nadu.
Hosur, one of the most industrialized places in the state, is located in this district.

Mining and forestry based activities
In Krishnagiri district, quarry leases are being granted for granite in Patta lands. Rough stone and earth quarry leases are being granted in government and patta lands under Tamil Nadu Minor Mineral Concession Rules 1959. The Public Works Department (WRO wing) is operating sand quarry in riverbeds. A state owned corporation called Tamil Nadu Metals and Mineral Ltd is also earning quarry and mining grants in government lands. The total mineral revenue realized during 2006-07 was Rs. 7.45 crores. It is ascertained that nearly 7,000 workers are being engaged in quarry activities.
As Krishnagiri District has 2,02,409 hectares of forest land which constitutes 39% of the total geographical area, there are abundant produce from the forest areas. Bamboo products, honey collection and tamarind production are the forestry land activities found in Anchetty, Denkanikotta, Thally and Berigai areas. This has generated employment opportunities for thousands of rural people in these areas.

Animal husbandry and fisheries
Fisheries
(Details about the revenue in fisheries up to 15 July 2007)

Animal husbandry
In Krishnagiri District the annual income in the animal husbandry sector was as follows for 2006-07.

Gallery

See also
Transport in Krishnagiri
List of districts of Tamil Nadu
Avathuvadi
Baliganur

References

External links

 Official website

 
Districts of Tamil Nadu
2004 establishments in Tamil Nadu